A Town area committee is a semi-municipal authority constituted for the administration of small towns in India. They are assigned a limited number of civic functions like street lighting, drainage, roads, conservancy, etc. Town area committees were established by an act passed by the state legislature. The act mentions the composition, functions, and other matters related to the town area committee. The members may be partly elected and partly nominated by the state government, or wholly nominated, or wholly elected. In some states, District Collectors are given powers of surveillance and control over the Town area committees.

References

Indian legislation
Government in Asia
Public administration
State government departments of India